Trois-Villes is a commune in the department of Pyrénées-Atlantiques in the Nouvelle-Aquitaine Region of south-western France.

The French military officer Comte de Troisville was a major landowner in this village.

It is located in the former province of Soule.

See also
Communes of the Pyrénées-Atlantiques department

References

Communes of Pyrénées-Atlantiques
Pyrénées-Atlantiques communes articles needing translation from French Wikipedia